Der Abend der schwarzen Folklore is the third album by Caspar Brötzmann Massaker, released in July 1992 through Our Choice.

Track listing

Personnel 
Musicians
Caspar Brötzmann – guitar, vocals, production, cover art
Eduardo Delgado-Lopez – bass guitar
Danny Arnold Lommen – drums
Production and additional personnel
Bruno Gebhard – production
Ingo Krauss – production
Dirk Rudolph – cover art

References

External links 
 

1992 albums
Caspar Brötzmann albums